The 1999 Borno State gubernatorial election occurred in Nigeria on January 9, 1999. The APP nominee Mala Kachalla won the election, defeating the PDP candidate, Baba Ahmad Jidda.

Mala Kachalla emerged APP candidate, while Baba Ahmad Jidda emerged the PDP candidate.

Electoral system
The Governor of Borno State is elected using the plurality voting system.

Primary election

APP primary
The APP primary election was won by Mala Kachalla.

PDP primary
The PDP primary election was won by Baba Ahmad Jidda.

Results
The total number of registered voters in the state was 1,690,943. Total number of votes cast was 765,241 while number of valid votes was 741,953. Rejected votes were 23,288.

References 

Borno State gubernatorial elections
Borno State gubernatorial election
Borno State gubernatorial election